"Nasty" is the ninth episode of British sitcom The Young Ones. It was written by Ben Elton, Rik Mayall and Lise Mayer, and directed by Paul Jackson. It was first aired on BBC2 on 29 May 1984.

Plot
The episode begins with a man playing chess against Death. After losing to the man, Death declares "Bollocks to this!" and attacks the man with his scythe. The horror movie-themed opening credits are followed by Mike, Rick, Vyvyan and Neil carrying a coffin through a local cemetery. The coffin is brought to a freshly-dug grave where a passing woman asks a spade-holding Neil if he digs graves, to which Neil replies, "Yeah, they're all right." After encountering a drunken vicar and two gravediggers, the episode then takes a flashback to events leading up to the burial. It is bath night, and while Neil jumps into the muddy bathwater used in the three others' previous baths (inadvertently finding his long-lost bicycle in the process), Rick locks himself in his room and gets on his bed for a sneaky read of Cosmopolitan - only to nearly get cut in half by Vyvyan's cleverly placed circular saw. Mike and Vyvyan spend the time trying to set up the new video recorder they have secured, in order to watch a video nasty. A scene-stealing postman then arrives to deliver a human-shaped package from the Transvaal. After falling out of the bathroom window and having his bedroom boarded up, Neil arrives downstairs wearing a dress he found in Rick's room (with Rick's name tagged in the back). Neil briefly gets the video machine to work by plugging it - but suffers a sustained electric shock in the process - and the group is shown a commercial for a women's pain reliever set in Hell.

After the video stops working once again, the package delivered earlier has opened. This turns out to be a vampire, who claims he is really just a driving instructor from Johannesburg. The vampire chases the boys, but stops to use the toilet. Locked in the toilet, the vampire's driving instructor ruse fails when he incorrectly answers Vyvyan's Highway Code question about what to do when crossing a humpback bridge. When the four realise that vampires only attack virgins, it leads to them all unconvincingly denying their sexual purity. But when the vampire returns downstairs, he is hit by sunlight streaming through the window (as he still has his wristwatch set to South African time) - and he is placed inside a dual-purpose sofa-coffin. The scene flash-forwards back to the graveyard, where Mike realises it is half-past nine. The vampire then comes out from the coffin and reveals himself to be Harry the Bastard, an employee from Rumbelows from whom they rented the video machine. Harry announces that their deadline for returning the machine has just elapsed and they now owe him £500 in late fees. As the closing line of the episode, the entire gang at the grave site turn to the camera and say, "Well, what a complete bastard!" The closing credits play over Death and the man from the chess match (who is now a ghost) arguing at a golf hole.

Characters
As with all episodes of The Young Ones, the main four characters were student housemates Mike (Christopher Ryan); Vyvyan (Adrian Edmondson); Rick (Rik Mayall) and Neil (Nigel Planer). Alexei Sayle starred as the South African vampire-slash-driving instructor. Monty Python alumnus Terry Jones makes a cameo as a drunken vicar and comedy duo Hale & Pace appear as a pair of gravediggers that the lads tell their story to. Arnold Brown appears as the man in the opening scene playing chess against Death. Dawn French and Helen Atkinson-Wood appear in the pain reliever commercial set in Hell.

Cultural references
The opening scene of a man playing chess with Death is a homage to the best known scene in Ingmar Bergman's film, The Seventh Seal (1957). At the grave site when the vicar says 'Ashes to ashes', Rick responds with 'Funk to funky, we all know Major Tom's a junkie', referencing lyrics from the David Bowie song "Ashes to Ashes". Later in the episode, Rick proclaims to Neil that the bathroom is free 'unlike the country' and refers to Britain as a ‘Thatcherite Junta’. Rick also appears to gain sexual gratification from looking at a copy of Cosmopolitan. Alexei Sayle's character - in a monologue about being a Marxist comedian - complains that while his comrades are selling the Socialist Worker, he has to sell the TV Times. Sayle continues his monologue to reassure his comrades that he has not ‘sold out’, then proceeds to do an advertisement for Pot Noodle. The episode also features punk band The Damned, performing Nasty, a song written especially for the episode.

After being told to shut up by Vyvyan, the postman responds, "Little squirt! Does one advert, and he thinks he's Dustin Hoffman!" This is a reference to Adrian Edmondson appearing as a Vyvyan-like character in a 1983 commercial for National Westminster Bank.

References

The Young Ones episodes
1984 British television episodes
Television shows written by Ben Elton